Events in the year 1905 in Japan.

Incumbents
Emperor: Emperor Meiji
Prime Minister: Katsura Tarō

Governors
Aichi Prefecture: Masaaki Nomura
Akita Prefecture: Oka Kishichiro Itami then Takejiro Yukaji
Aomori Prefecture: Shotaro Nishizawa
Ehime Prefecture: Kensuke Ando
Fukui Prefecture: Suke Sakamoto
Fukushima Prefecture: Arita Yoshisuke
Gifu Prefecture: Kawaji Toshikyo 
Gunma Prefecture: Yoshimi Teru
Hiroshima Prefecture: Yamada Haruzo
Ibaraki Prefecture: Teru Terahara
Iwate Prefecture: Sokkichi Oshikawa
Kagawa Prefecture: Motohiro Onoda
Kochi Prefecture: Munakata Tadashi
Kumamoto Prefecture: Egi Kazuyuki
Kyoto Prefecture: Baron Shoichi Omori
Mie Prefecture: Lord Arimitsu Hideyoshi
Miyagi Prefecture: Kamei Ezaburo
Miyazaki Prefecture: Toda Tsunetaro 
Nagano Prefecture: Seki Kiyohide then Akira Oyama
Niigata Prefecture: Hiroshi Abe
Oita Prefecture: Ogura Hisashi
Okinawa Prefecture: Shigeru Narahara
Saga Prefecture: Fai Kagawa
Saitama Prefecture: Marquis Okubo Toshi Takeshi
Shiga Prefecture: Sada Suzuki
Shiname Prefecture: Matsunaga Takeyoshi
Tochigi Prefecture: Kubota Kiyochika 
Tokushima Prefecture: Saburo Iwao
Tokyo: Baron Sangay Takatomi
Toyama Prefecture: Rika Ryusuke then Shinhare Kawakami
Yamagata Prefecture: Tanaka Takamichi 
Yamanashi Prefecture: Takeda Chiyosaburo

Events
 January 2: The Russian Army surrenders at Port Arthur in China.
January 25–29: Battle of Sandepu
February 20-March 10: Battle of Mukden
April 1: Japan–Korea Agreement of April 1905
May 27–28: Battle of Tsushima
August 13: Japan–Korea Agreement of August 1905
September 1: Kobe Steel has founded.
September 5: Treaty of Portsmouth signed, ending Russo-Japanese War
Hibiya Incendiary Incident
November 17: Japan–Korea Treaty of 1905

Births
January 3 – Nobuhito, Prince Takamatsu (d. 1987)
January 5 – Tamako Kataoka, artist (d. 2008)
January 14 – Takeo Fukuda, Prime Minister of Japan (d. 1995)
January 15 – Kamatari Fujiwara, actor (d. 1985)
March 12 – Takashi Shimura, actor (d. 1982)
April 1 – Asaichi Isobe, army officer (d. 1937)
May 14 – Kunio Maekawa, architect (d. 1986)
May 28 – Sada Abe, geisha and prostitute (d. 1970?)
July 2 – Tatsuzō Ishikawa, writer (d. 1985)
August 20 – Mikio Naruse, filmmaker (d. 1969)
October 2 – Fumiko Enchi, writer (d. 1986)
October 3 – Taiko Hirabayashi, writer (d. 1972)
November 15 – Tamiki Hara, writer (d. 1951)

Deaths
January 31 – Soejima Taneomi, diplomat and statesman (b. 1828)
April 13 – Taguchi Ukichi, historian and economist (b. 1855)

References

 
1900s in Japan